One of the Boys is the third studio solo album by the Who's lead vocalist, Roger Daltrey. It was released in 1977, on Polydor in the UK, and MCA in the US. The sessions were recorded at the Who's Ramport Studios during the winter of 1976 (vocals were recorded at Pathe Marconi Studios in Paris, due to tax complications), and Daltrey allowed students from the local Battersea technical school to film them as an educational project. This also marked the first time that Daltrey had written or co-written a song since "Here for More" (released as the B-side of the Who's "The Seeker") in 1970, and Lisztomania in 1975. Daltrey's original choice for producers were Jerry Leiber and Mike Stoller, but they declined.

When Leo Sayer launched his own career as a singer, Daltrey called on a widening group of friends to write for and perform on his (Daltrey's) albums. Paul McCartney contributed the new song "Giddy" to One of the Boys, where the band included Hank B. Marvin of the Shadows, Eric Clapton, Alvin Lee and Mick Ronson, as well as calling on a member of the Who, John Entwistle.

Album cover art
On this cover, after releasing Ride a Rock Horse with Daltrey as a rampant centaur, another visual trick is played with Daltrey's mirror image, with reference to Magritte's famous painting Not to Be Reproduced, photographed and designed by Daltrey's cousin Graham Hughes

Tracks background
"Parade" is a cover song originally released on Phillip Goodhand-Tait's sixth solo album, Teaching an Old Dog New Tricks, in 1976.

"Single Man's Dilemma" was written by Colin Blunstone for Daltrey. Blunstone is the lead vocalist for The Zombies.

"Avenging Annie" is a cover song originally released on Andy Pratt's second solo album, Andy Pratt, in 1973. The song was released as a single (by Daltrey) in October 1977, reaching No. 88 in the US, but was not released in the UK.

"Leon" was written and recorded by Phillip Goodhand-Tait in 1972 and originally released on his third album Songfall. The song was released as a single (by Daltrey) in April 1978 but did not chart and was not released in the UK.

"One of the Boys" was written by Steve Gibbons about Daltrey. Gibbons did his own version live in 1977; a recording was released on his live album, Caught in the Act. The song was released as a single (by Daltrey) in June 1977 but did not chart; the song was not released in the US.

"Giddy" was written by the Beatles' Paul McCartney for Daltrey, The song started off as a demo called "Rode All Night"; the refrain was later incorporated into "Giddy".

"Written on the Wind" was written by Paul Korda for Daltrey. The song features Korda playing piano; it was released as a single in April 1977, reaching No. 46 in the UK, but was not released in the US.

"Say It Ain't So, Joe" is a cover of song originally released on Murray Head's second solo album, Say It Ain't So, in 1975. The song was released as a single (by Daltrey) in July 1977 but did not chart; it was not released in the UK. The song was rereleased in February 1978 with a different B-side.

Critical reception
Writing for AllMusic, critic William Ruhlmann said that "Roger Daltrey called on a wider circle of friends for his third album and came up with a more varied collection of songs ... But Daltrey was never in danger of getting lost in the all-star session. Nevertheless, the album was not treated as a major release and found only modest commercial success."

Track listing

Bonus tracks (2005 reissue)

Personnel 

 Roger Daltrey - lead vocals, harmonica
 Alvin Lee - guitar
 Jimmy McCulloch - guitar
 Paul Keogh - guitar
 Hank B. Marvin - guitar
 Eric Clapton - guitar
 Mick Ronson - guitar
 Brian Odgers - bass guitar
 John Entwistle - bass guitar, "Boris" vocals on "One of the Boys" and "Avenging Annie"
 Rod Argent - keyboards
 Paul Korda - piano on "Written on the Wind"
 Phil Kenzie - saxophone
 Jimmy Jewell - saxophone
 Stuart Tosh - drums
 Andy Fairweather-Low - backing vocals
 John Perry - backing vocals
 Tony Rivers - backing vocals
 Stuart Calver - backing vocals

Engineering
 Tony Meehan - arrangements
 Phil McDonald - engineer
 Judy Szekely - assistant engineer
 Nigel Walker - assistant engineer 

Album cover art
 Graham Hughes - photography, design
 Ian Murray - typography

Sales chart performance
Album

Singles

See also
Roger Daltrey discography

References

External links
 

1977 albums
Roger Daltrey albums
MCA Records albums